John Irwin (July 21, 1861 – February 28, 1934) was a third baseman in Major League Baseball in the 19th century.

Sources

1861 births
1928 deaths
Canadian expatriate baseball players in the United States
Major League Baseball players from Canada
Major League Baseball third basemen
Worcester Ruby Legs players
Philadelphia Athletics (AA) players
Washington Nationals (1886–1889) players
Buffalo Bisons (PL) players
Louisville Colonels players
19th-century baseball players
Boston Reds (UA) players
Boston Reds (AA) players
Baseball people from Ontario
Minor league baseball managers
Bay City (minor league baseball) players
Haverhill (minor league baseball) players
Newburyport Clamdiggers players
Biddeford (minor league baseball) players
Newark Little Giants players
Wilkes-Barre Barons (baseball) players
Lincoln Rustlers players
Brockton Shoemakers players
Binghamton Bingoes players
Wilkes-Barre Coal Barons players
Lawrence Indians players
New York Metropolitans (minor league) players
Taunton Herrings players
Manchester Manchesters players